Coleophora tetrazonella is a moth of the family Coleophoridae. It is found in Samarkand, Uzbekistan.

References

tetrazonella
Moths of Asia
Moths described in 1874